Hyperinflation in Yugoslavia may refer to:

 Hyperinflation in the Socialist Federal Republic of Yugoslavia
 Hyperinflation in the Federal Republic of Yugoslavia